Willow is a 1988 American high fantasy adventure film directed by Ron Howard and produced by Nigel Wooll. The film was executive produced by George Lucas and written by Bob Dolman from a story by Lucas. The film stars Val Kilmer, Joanne Whalley, Warwick Davis, and Jean Marsh. Davis portrays the title character, an aspiring magician who teams up with a disaffected warrior (Kilmer) to protect a baby from an evil queen (Marsh).

Lucas conceived the idea for the film in 1972, approaching Howard to direct during the post-production phase of Cocoon in 1985. Bob Dolman was brought in to write the screenplay, coming up with seven drafts before finishing in late 1986. It was then set up at Metro-Goldwyn-Mayer and principal photography began in April 1987, finishing the following October. The majority of filming took place in Dinorwic quarry in Wales with some at Elstree Studios in Hertfordshire, as well as a small section in New Zealand. Industrial Light & Magic created the visual effects sequences, which led to a revolutionary breakthrough with digital morphing technology.

The film was released in 1988 to mixed reviews from critics with some praising the special effects and character designs while some criticized the direction and plot. It grossed $137.6 million worldwide against a $35 million budget. While not the blockbuster some expected, it turned a profit based on international box office returns and strong home video and television returns. Additionally, it received two Academy Award nominations. A television series that serves as a sequel to the film was released on Disney+ in 2022.

Plot

In an unnamed fantasy world, the evil sorceress Queen Bavmorda of Nockmaar hears of a prophecy that a child with a special rune birthmark will bring about her downfall. As a preventative measure, she imprisons all pregnant women in her domain. The foretold child is born, but her mother persuades the midwife to smuggle the baby out of the castle. Bavmorda executes the mother and sends her wolf-like Nockmaar Hounds after the midwife. With the hounds closing in on her, the midwife sets the baby adrift on a grass raft in a river before succumbing to the hounds. Meanwhile, Bavmorda sends her daughter Sorsha and an army led by General Kael to hunt down the baby.

Some distance downriver, a village of Nelwyn (a race of dwarves) prepares for a festival. The baby is found by the children of farmer and aspiring sorcerer Willow Ufgood and his family takes her in and comes to love her. At the festival, a Nockmaar hound arrives and attacks all the cradles it finds. After the Nelwyn warriors kill it, Willow presents the baby to the village leader, the High Aldwin, as the probable reason for the dog's appearance. The High Aldwin orders the baby must return to a Daikini (the Nelwyn's name for "tall people") family, so Willow and a party of volunteers set out with the baby to find one.

At a crossroads, they find Madmartigan, a mercenary trapped in a crow's cage, who offers to take the baby in exchange for his freedom. The majority of the Nelwyn think they should give the baby to him, but Willow and his friend Meegosh refuse, causing the others to abandon them and go home. After meeting Madmartigan's old comrade Airk, on his way with an army to attack Bavmorda, Willow relents and agrees to Madmartigan's terms.

On the way home, Willow and Meegosh discover that some brownies have stolen the baby, and pursue them. They are captured by the brownies, but Fairy Queen Cherlindrea frees them and explains the baby is Elora Danan, the foretold Princess of Tir Asleen. She gives Willow a magic wand and sends him to find Fin Raziel, an aging enchantress.

Willow sends Meegosh home, and continues the journey in the company of two of the brownies, Franjean and Rool. On the way, he re-encounters Madmartigan, who is disguising himself as a woman to hide from his mistress's husband Llug. Sorsha and Kael's army arrives, but Madmartigan is revealed as a man to Llug, who starts a brawl which helps Willow and Madmartigan escape with Elora.

Madmartigan, seemingly reluctantly, leads Willow to the lake where Raziel lives. They are captured soon thereafter, along with Raziel, who has been turned into a brushtail possum by Bavmorda. Willow tries to restore her, but he turns her into a rook.

Franjean accidentally doses Madmartigan with Love Potion. Madmartigan declares undying love for Sorsha, but she is skeptical. Willow's party flees, finding Airk and the remnants of his army after Bavmorda defeated them. When the Nockmaar army pursues, Madmartigan takes Sorsha hostage, and they flee once more. However, Sorsha escapes.

Willow's party arrives at Tir Asleen, only to find it cursed and overrun with trolls. Kael's army arrives, and Madmartigan and Willow attempt to fend them off. Willow accidentally turns a troll into a two-headed Eborsisk monster with the wand, and in the chaos that ensues, Kael kidnaps Elora. Sorsha, realizing she has fallen in love with Madmartigan, defects to his side. Airk's army arrives, but Kael, carrying Elora on horseback, rides through them and makes his way to Nockmaar Castle. Bavmorda orders preparation of a ritual to banish Elora from the world forever.

Willow's party and Airk's army arrive at Nockmaar Castle, but Bavmorda casts a spell to turn them all to pigs. Willow, having used the wand to protect himself, finally restores Raziel to her human form. She breaks Bavmorda's spell over the army and they trick their way into the castle. Kael slays Airk, but Madmartigan avenges him, as Willow, Sorsha, and Raziel confront Bavmorda in the ritual chamber. After a grueling fight, Bavmorda incapacitates Raziel and Sorsha. Willow uses sleight-of-hand to trick Bavmorda into thinking he has made Elora disappear. Bavmorda, unnerved, moves to attack him, but in doing so accidentally completes the ritual, banishing herself.

During celebrations at the restored Tir Asleen, Willow is gifted a spellbook by Raziel. Leaving Elora in the care of Madmartigan and Sorsha, Willow returns home to his village and family in triumph.

Cast

Production

Development
George Lucas conceived the idea for the film (originally titled Munchkins) in 1972. Similar in intent to Star Wars, he created "a number of well-known mythological situations for a young audience". During the production of Return of the Jedi in 1982, Lucas approached Warwick Davis, who was portraying Wicket the Ewok, about playing Willow Ufgood. Five years passed before he was actually cast in the role. Lucas "thought it would be great to use a little person in a lead role. A lot of my movies are about a little guy against the system, and this was just a more literal interpretation of that idea."

Lucas explained that he had to wait until the mid-1980s to make the film because visual effects technology was finally advanced enough to execute his vision. Meanwhile, actor-turned-director Ron Howard was looking to do a fantasy film. He was at Industrial Light & Magic during the post-production phase of Cocoon, when he was first approached by Lucas to direct Willow. He had previously starred in Lucas's American Graffiti, and Lucas felt that he and Howard shared a symbiotic relationship similar to the one he enjoyed with Steven Spielberg. Howard nominated Bob Dolman to write the screenplay based on Lucas's story. Dolman had worked with him on a 1983 television pilot called Little Shots that had not resulted in a series, and Lucas admired Dolman's work on the sitcom WKRP in Cincinnati.

Dolman joined Howard and Lucas at Skywalker Ranch for a series of lengthy story conferences, and wrote seven drafts of his script between the spring and fall of 1986. Pre-production began in late 1986. Various major film studios turned down the chance to distribute and cofinance it with Lucasfilm because they believed the fantasy genre was unsuccessful. This was largely due to films such as Krull, Legend, Dragonslayer, and Labyrinth. Lucas took it to Metro-Goldwyn-Mayer (MGM), which was headed by Alan Ladd Jr. Ladd and Lucas shared a relationship as far back as the mid-1970s, when Ladd, running 20th Century Fox, greenlit Lucas's idea for Star Wars. However, in 1986, MGM was facing financial troubles, and major investment in a fantasy film was perceived as a risk. Ladd advanced half of the $35 million budget in return for theatrical and television rights, leaving Lucasfilm with home video and pay television rights to offer in exchange for the other half. RCA/Columbia Pictures Home Video paid $15 million to Lucas in exchange for the video rights.

Lucas named the character of General Kael (Pat Roach) after film critic Pauline Kael, a fact that was not lost on Kael in her printed review of the film. She referred to General Kael as an "homage a moi". Similarly, the two-headed dragon was called an "Eborsisk" after film critics Gene Siskel and Roger Ebert.

Filming
Principal photography began on April 2, 1987, and ended the following October. Interior footage took place at Elstree Studios in Hertfordshire, England, while location shooting took place in Dinorwic quarry, Wales, and New Zealand. Lucas initially visualized shooting the film similar to Return of the Jedi, with studio scenes at Elstree and locations in Northern California, but the idea eventually faded. However, some exteriors were done around Skywalker Ranch and on location at Burney Falls, near Mount Shasta. The Chinese government refused Lucas the chance for a brief location shoot. He then sent a group of photographers to South China to photograph specific scenery, which was then used for background blue screen footage. Tongariro National Park in New Zealand was chosen to house Bavmorda's castle.

Some of the waterfalls scenes for the movie were shot at Burney Falls in Northern California, although Powerscourt Waterfall in Ireland was also used for other scenes.

Visual effects

Lucasfilm's Industrial Light & Magic (ILM) created the visual effects sequences. The script called for Willow to restore Fin Raziel (Patricia Hayes) from a goat to her human form. Willow recites what he thinks is the appropriate spell, but turns the goat into an ostrich, a peacock, a tortoise and, finally, a tiger, before returning her to normal. ILM supervisor Dennis Muren considered using CGI stop-motion animation for the scene. He also explained that another traditional and practical way in the late 1980s to execute this sequence would have been through the use of an optical dissolve with cutaways at various stages.

Muren found both stop motion and optical effects to be too technically challenging and decided that the transformation scene would be a perfect opportunity for ILM to create advances with digital morphing technology. He proposed filming each animal, and the actress doubling for Hayes, and then feeding the images into a computer program developed by Doug Smythe. The program would then create a smooth transition from one stage to another before outputting the result back onto film. Smythe began development of the necessary software in September 1987. By March 1988, Muren and fellow designer David Allen achieved what would represent a breakthrough for computer-generated imagery (CGI). The techniques developed for the sequence were later utilized by ILM for Indiana Jones and the Last Crusade, Terminator 2: Judgment Day, and Star Trek VI: The Undiscovered Country.

The head of ILM's animation department, Wes Takahashi, supervised the film's animation sequences.

Soundtrack

The film score was written by James Horner and performed by the London Symphony Orchestra.  According to Horner, "I am a musicologist, a doctor of music. Therefore I listened to, studied and analysed a lot of music. I also enjoy metaphors, the art of quoting and of cycles. The harmonic draft of the Willow score, and most particularly its spiritual side, came from such a cycle, from such mythology and music history that I was taught, and that I myself convey with my own emotions and compositions."

Eclectic influences on the score include Leoš Janáček's Glagolitic Mass, Mozart's "Requiem", "The Nine Splendid Stags" from Béla Bartók, Edvard Grieg's "Arabian Dance" for the theater play Peer Gynt, and compositions by Sergei Prokofiev.

"Willow's Theme" purposefully (see Horner's quote above) contains a reworking/alteration of part of the theme of the first movement ("Lebhaft") of Robert Schumann's Symphony No. 3 referencing it, while "Elora Danan's Theme" shows a reference to the Bulgarian folk song "Mir Stanke Le" (Мир Станке ле), also known as the "Harvest Song from Thrace".

Track listing
"Elora Danan" – 9:45
"Escape from the Tavern" – 5:04
"Willow's Journey Begins" – 5:26
"Canyon of Mazes" – 7:52
"Tir Asleen" – 10:47
"Willow's Theme" – 3:54
"Bavmorda's Spell is Cast" – 18:11
"Willow the Sorcerer" – 11:55

In June 2022, Intrada released an expanded score across two CDs (Special Collection Volume ISC 476), with this track listing:

CD 1
"Elora Danan" – 9:45
"The Nelwyns" – 2:41
"The Nelwyns No. 2" – 2:35
"Death Dogs" – 2:26
"Willow’s Journey Begins" – 5:26
"Bavmorda’s Castle" – 1:21
"Airk’s Army" – 3:26
"The Enchanted Forest" – 5:31
"Escape From The Tavern" – 5:04
"The Island" – 5:10
"Willow Captured" – 1:59
"Arrival At Snow Camp" – 1:17
"The Sled Ride" – 7:56

CD 2
"Willow’s Theme" – 3:54
"Canyon Of Mazes" – 7:52
"Tir Asleen" – 10:47
"Bavmorda’s Spell Is Cast" – 18:11
"Willow The Sorcerer" – 11:55

Release

Box office
The film was shown and promoted at the 1988 Cannes Film Festival. It was released on May 20, 1988, in 1,209 theaters, earning $8,300,169 in its opening weekend, placing number one at the weekend box office. Lucas had hoped it would earn as much money as E.T. the Extra-Terrestrial, but the film faced early competition with Crocodile Dundee II, Big and Rambo III. Grossing $57.3 million at the box office in the United States and Canada it was not the blockbuster hit insiders had anticipated. The film opened in Japan in July and grossed $16.7 million in its first seven weeks, MGM's highest-grossing film in Japan at the time. It performed well in other international markets, grossing $80.3 million for a  worldwide total of $137.6 million. Strong home video, and television sales added to its profits.

Critical reception
Willow was released to mixed reviews from critics.  On Metacritic, the film has a score of 47 out of 100 based on 12 critics, indicating "mixed or average reviews". Audiences polled by CinemaScore gave the film an average grade of "A-" on an A+ to F scale.

Janet Maslin from The New York Times praised Lucas's storytelling, but was critical of Ron Howard's direction. "Howard appears to have had his hands full in simply harnessing the special effects," Maslin said.

Siskel & Ebert gave it Two Thumbs Down.

Desson Thomson writing in The Washington Post, explained "Rob Reiner's similar fairytale adventure The Princess Bride (which the cinematographer Adrian Biddle also shot) managed to evoke volumes more without razzle-dazzle. It's a sad thing to be faulting Lucas, maker of the Star Wars trilogy and Raiders of the Lost Ark, for forgetting the tricks of entertainment." Mike Clark in USA Today wrote that "the rainstorm wrap-up, in which Good edges Evil is like Led Zeppelin Meets The Wild Bunch. The film is probably too much for young children and possibly too much of the same for cynics. But any 6–13-year-old who sees this may be bitten by the ’movie bug’ for life."

Accolades
At the Academy Awards, the film was nominated for Sound Effects Editing and Visual Effects, but lost both to Who Framed Roger Rabbit, which was similarly done by Industrial Light & Magic. It won Best Costume Design at the Saturn Awards, where it was also nominated for Warwick Davis for Best Performance by a Younger Actor (lost to Fred Savage for Vice Versa) and Jean Marsh for Best Supporting Actress (lost to Sylvia Sidney for Beetlejuice). It also lost Best Fantasy Film and the Hugo Award for Best Dramatic Presentation to Who Framed Roger Rabbit. It was also nominated for two Golden Raspberry Awards including Worst Screenplay, which lost to Cocktail and Worst Supporting Actor for Billy Barty, who lost to Dan Aykroyd for Caddyshack II.

Home media
The film was first released on VHS, Betamax, Video 8, and LaserDisc on November 22, 1988 by RCA/Columbia Pictures Home Video and had multiple re-releases on VHS in the 1990s under Columbia TriStar Home Video as well as a Widescreen LaserDisc in 1995. 20th Century Fox Home Entertainment re-released the film on VHS and on DVD for the first time as a "special edition" in November 2001. The release included an audio commentary by Warwick Davis and two "making of" featurettes. In the commentary, Davis confirms that there were a number of "lost scenes" previously rumored to have been deleted from it including a battle in the valley, Willow battling a boy who transforms into a shark in a lake while retrieving Fin Raziel, and an extended sorceress duel at the climax. George Lucas and 20th Century Fox Home Entertainment released the film on Blu-ray Disc on March 12, 2013, with an all-new digital transfer overseen by Lucasfilm. Following Disney's acquisition of Lucasfilm (and 21st Century Fox's assets), the film was re-released by Walt Disney Studios Home Entertainment on Blu-ray, DVD, and Digital (for the first time) on January 29, 2019, and was later made available to stream on Disney+ when the service launched on November 12, 2019.

Other media

Board game
In 1988, Tor Books released The Willow Game, a two- to six-player adventure board game based on the film and designed by Greg Costikyan.

Video games
Three video games based on the film were released. Mindscape published an action game in 1988 for Amiga, Atari ST, Commodore 64, and DOS. Japanese game developer Capcom published two different games in 1989 based on the film; the first Willow is a platform game for the arcades and the second Willow game is a role-playing game for the Nintendo Entertainment System.

Novels
Wayland Drew adapted Lucas's story into a film novel, providing additional background information to several major characters and various additional scenes, including an encounter with a lake monster near Raziel's island which was filmed, but ultimately not used in the movie. A segment of that scene's filmed material can be found in the DVD's "Making of Willow" documentary.

Lucas outlined the Chronicles of the Shadow War trilogy to follow the film and hired comic book writer/novelist Chris Claremont to adapt them into a series of books. They take place about fifteen years after the original film and feature the teenage Elora Danan as a central character.
Shadow Moon (1995) 
Shadow Dawn (1996) 
Shadow Star (2000)

Television series

Beginning in 2005, Lucas and Davis discussed the possibility of a television series serving as a sequel to Willow. Throughout the years, in various interviews, Davis expressed interest in reprising his role as the title character.

In May 2018, Howard confirmed that there were ongoing discussions regarding a sequel, while confirming the project would not be called Willow 2. In 2019, Ron Howard announced that a sequel television series was currently in development, with intentions for the series to be exclusively released on the Disney+ streaming service. Jonathan Kasdan would be involved in the television series, while Warwick Davis would reprise his role from the original film. George Lucas would not participate in this series.

In October 2020, the series was officially green-lit by Disney+, with Ron Howard set to executive produce the series alongside Kasdan, Wendy Mericle, and Jon M. Chu. Chu will direct the series first episode, with Kasdan and Mericle serving as showrunners, Warwick Davis reprising his role as Willow Ufgood, and Bob Dolman serving as a consulting producer. In December 2020, it was announced the show would be released in 2022. In January 2021, Chu left his directorial duties due to production moving towards the summer and it corresponding with birth of his next child.

That same month, it was revealed that Jonathan Entwistle had officially been hired to replace Chu as director, with filming commencing in Spring 2021 in Wales. However, due to production delays as a result of a recasting, Entwistle also exited the series, with Stephen Woolfenden coming in to direct the first two episodes of the series.

In November 2021, a promo video featuring the cast of the series was released for Disney+ Day. The new live-action series premiered on November 30, 2022 on Disney+.

References

Further reading
 (Novelization of the film)
 (Comic book adaptation of the film)

External links

 at 

Willow (film)
1988 films
1988 fantasy films
1980s American films
1980s fantasy adventure films
1980s English-language films
American dark fantasy films
American epic fantasy films
American fantasy adventure films
American films about revenge
American high fantasy films
Films about dwarfs
Films about fairies and sprites
Films about friendship
Films about magic and magicians
Films about shapeshifting
Films about witchcraft
Films about wizards
Films adapted into comics
Films directed by Ron Howard
Films scored by James Horner
Films set in castles
Films set in the Middle Ages
Films shot at EMI-Elstree Studios
Films shot in Hertfordshire
Films shot in New Zealand
Films shot in Wales
Films using stop-motion animation
Films with screenplays by George Lucas
Imagine Entertainment films
Lucasfilm films
Metro-Goldwyn-Mayer films